Kondratyevskaya is a rural locality (a village) in Moseyevskoye Rural Settlement, Totemsky District, Vologda Oblast, Russia. The population was 12 as of 2002.

Geography 
Kondratyevskaya is located 32 km northwest of Totma (the district's administrative centre) by road. Moseyevo is the nearest rural locality.

References 

Rural localities in Tarnogsky District